The 242nd Infantry Division (242. Infanterie-Division) was a division of the Imperial German Army during World War I. The division was formed on January 16, 1917, and was part of the last large wave of new divisions created during World War I.  The division was assembled over the next two months from elements from other units.  Its core was the 9. Württembergisches Infanterie-Regiment Nr. 127, a regular infantry regiment from the Kingdom of Württemberg, as well as a brigade headquarters from a regular Württemberg infantry division.  To this were added two newly raised Württemberg infantry regiments, along with cavalry, artillery, engineers and support units.  The division was considered a Württemberg infantry division and received its initial troops and replacements from that kingdom.

The division entered the trenchline in a quiet sector of Lorraine in March 1917, and after a period of orientation, was sent to fight in the Second Battle of the Aisne, also called the Third Battle of Champagne.  It spent the rest of 1917 and the first part of 1918 in positional warfare near Reims and in a defensive fight near Verdun.  In 1918, the division participated in the German spring offensive, in the region of Montdidier-Noyon.  The division was on the defensive thereafter, including during the Allied Hundred Days Offensive. The division was demobilized in 1919. In 1917, Allied intelligence rated the division a good division with high morale, but by 1918 it was rated a third class division.

The organization of the division on May 2, 1918, was as follows:

242. Infanterie-Brigade:
9. Württembergisches Infanterie-Regiment Nr. 127
Württembergisches Infanterie-Regiment Nr. 475
Württembergisches Infanterie-Regiment Nr. 476
Maschinengewehr-Scharfschützen-Abteilung Nr. 78
2.Eskadron/Württembergisches Reserve-Dragoner-Regiment
Württembergisches Feldartillerie-Regiment Nr. 281
III.Bataillon/Hohenzollernsches Fußartillerie-Regiment Nr. 13
Württembergisches Bataillon Nr. 242
Divisions-Nachrichten-Kommandeur 242

References
 242. Infanterie-Division  (Chronik 1917/1918) – Der erste Weltkrieg
 Hermann Cron et al., Ruhmeshalle unserer alten Armee (Berlin, 1935)
 Hermann Cron, Geschichte des deutschen Heeres im Weltkriege 1914–1918 (Berlin, 1937)
 Histories of Two Hundred and Fifty-One Divisions of the German Army which Participated in the War (1914–1918), compiled from records of Intelligence section of the General Staff, American Expeditionary Forces, at General Headquarters, Chaumont, France 1919, (1920)

Notes

Military units and formations established in 1917
Military units and formations disestablished in 1919
1917 establishments in Germany
Infantry divisions of Germany in World War I